Sherrod Park is a national historic district located at High Point, Guilford County, North Carolina.  The district encompasses 73 contributing buildings and 1 contributing site in a residential section of High point developed between 1926 and 1941.  They include notable examples of Tudor Revival, Colonial Revival, and Bungalow / American Craftsman style architecture.

It was listed on the National Register of Historic Places in 1991.

References

High Point, North Carolina
Historic districts on the National Register of Historic Places in North Carolina
Tudor Revival architecture in North Carolina
Colonial Revival architecture in North Carolina
Buildings and structures in Guilford County, North Carolina